Sleepless (Italian: Non ho sonno) is a 2001 Italian giallo film directed by Dario Argento. The film stars Max von Sydow and Stefano Dionisi and marks Argento's return to the giallo subgenre. The film was another box office success when it opened in Italy, taking in over 5,019,733,505 lira ($3,280,080 US) by the end of its theatrical run.

Plot 
The movie opens with a woman, Angela, shown just after sex with a man who's cowering under bedsheets and angrily harassing the woman from not being fully satisfied out of shame. When Angela gets her things, she knocks a chest over with bladed weapons, which scares her and causes her to flee. Unwittingly take a scrapbook with her, she reads it and sees it's memorabilia an unidentified serial killer in Turin, nicknamed "The Drawf Killer". The unseen killer from before calls Angela and threatens her life. With the train conductor of no help, she calls her dear friend Marta to retrieve the scrapbook from her at the station. As the killer's found Angela and followed her on the train, he chases her and cuts off her finger when she tries to close a door on him or jump off the train. When she's cornered, he slashes her throat. Marta finds Angela's corpse and, albeit horrified, takes the book with her to her car. The killer follows her, barges through her car door, and stabs her to death in the driver's seat before taking the book back.

Detective Ulisse Moretti (Max von Sydow) was the primary investigator of the original series of murders in 1983, keeping in close contact with Giacomo Gallo, the only survivor of the spree who saw his mother, Maria repeatedly stabbed to death in her mouth with her own English horn. The first three killings in the spree became known as The Dwarf Murders because the main suspect, Vincenzo de Fabritiis, was a writer of crime fiction with dwarfism, but he died of natural causes and the case was considered closed. Detective Moretti, since retired from the force, was never fully convinced, and Giacomo has taken yesrs to cope despite nagging missing details haunting him all his later life. Giacomo has since had a girlfriend, Gloria, and his best friend Lorenzo Betti has just returned from studied abroad arranged by Betti's aristocratic father.

Meanwhile, the killings continue to escalate. Nightclub worker Mel is just getting off her shift, when the killer follows her, then jumps her in a surprise attack. Dragging her to an indoor fountain during a lengthy struggle, he drowns Mel, then aggressively cuts off her fingernails very low because she scratched him during the fight. Moretti is back on the case unofficially, and Giacomo joins to offer his memories and  because he needs answers for the sake of his mother. The variations in the murders puzzle them both, as does the change of from being in the same neighborhood in 1983 to spread across the whole city.

Beeper finds information on the killer and blackmails him into arranging a meeting. The killer confronts Beppe by stabbing him to death. Giacomo questions de Fabritiis' friend Leone, who also has drawfism and drinks too much. Vincent's mother Laura is highly unhappy to see Moretti and still grieving the death and slander of her son. The killer murders another woman, Dora, by pushing her into her apartment building and slamming her face into a wall repeatedly, hard enough to knock her teeth out. While conversing with his pet parrot, Moretti goes over the murders and realizes the modus operandi matches the violence in a disturbed nursery rhyme, "The Crazy Farmer". He reconvenes with Giacomo and reads the rhyme, mentioning a farmer was driven insane and killed all his animals the same way each of the victims were murdered. He theorizes the killer was mad from the nursery rhyme after hallucinating the noises of the animals, and they eventually figure out the likely next victim: since the last animal to die is a swan, they go to a ballet to try and protect the dancers. They're too late, as one, Mara, is violently beheaded by the killer.

Laura eventually sees a silhouette she assumes is Vincent, which scares her into falling over her banister in her home and dying from the fall. Detective Moretti is scared into a fatal heart attack from the same silhouette in his home. Giacomo knows they were murdered, so he goes to Leone's apartment for evidence, only to find him shot dead in his face. Betti's father appears and shoots Giacomo in his shoulder. But after changing his mind about killing him, the man shoots his own head and apologizes to Lorenzo, who appeared on the scene with Gloria, just before he dies. Giacomo then realizes the killer of both sprees was no drawf, but a child, which explained his expanded mobility.

Giacomo confronted Lorenzo as the killer, with one crucial piece of evidence: a hissing sound he heard during Marta's murder was Lorenzo's medical inhaler. Mr. Betti transferred Lorenzo out  of the country to stop him, then killed Leone when he was sure Lorenzo was murdering again. Lorenzo smugly confesses he doesn't care his father's dead, and he was glad to return for the "game" of Giacomo trying to catch him. Lorenzo was driven mad by hearing animal noises, hallucinating them coming from women and killing them accordingly based on the rhyme. They never felt in danger in 1983 because of his young age, and when he went to Geneva and New York City, he slaughtered more people since the nursery rhyme was known internationally.

When Giacomo tries to grab a kitchen knife, Lorenzo pulls his own knife on Gloria and threatens to kill her if he doesn't leave. Giacomo complies just enough for Lorenzo to get to a window, where the active detective on the case shoots Betti's shoulder, them blows a shot through his head, killing him instantly. The scene is a bloody mess, and the police raid the apartment while Giacomo consoles Gloria over the murders finally being over.

Cast 

 Max von Sydow as Ulisse Moretti
 Stefano Dionisi as Giacomo Gallo
 Chiara Caselli as Gloria
 Roberto Zibetti as Lorenzo Betti
 Gabriele Lavia as Dr. Betti
 Paolo Maria Scalondro as Chief Inspector Manni
 Rossella Falk as Laura de Fabritiis
 Roberto Accornero as Fausto
 Barbara Lerici as Angela
 Guido Morbello as Young Detective
 Massimo Sarchielli as Leone
 Diego Casale as Beppe
 Alessandra Comerio as Mrs. Betti
 Elena Marchesini as Mel (Kitten)
 Aldo Massasso as Detective Cascio
 Conchita Puglisi as Amanda
 Barbara Mautino as Dora (The Little Rabbit)
 Luca Fagioli as Vincenzo de Fabritiis (the dwarf)
 Daniela Fazzolari as Maria Luisa 
 Rossella Lucà as Mara

Critical reception 

Sleepless received a mixed response from critics. On movie review aggregator website Rotten Tomatoes the film has an approval rating of 50% based on ten reviews, and is certified "rotten". BBC Online wrote, "If this movie commits one crime, it's that the rest of it is never quite as good as the bravura opening. Don't let your guard down, though, because there are some cruelly well executed set-pieces that are enrobed in a constant sense of dread." AllMovie gave the film a generally negative review, writing, "this feels like an Argento retread – the murder mystery recalls his 1971 Cat o' Nine Tails a little too much, and the overly familiar horrific elements (pace, editing, music, screaming) have little impact."

Release 
The film was first released in cinemas in its native country of Italy on
5 January 2001. Later that year, Sleepless was released in the 
United States in limited theaters on 24 August 2001 from Artisan Entertainment
before shortly being released on home video formats in the winter.

Alternate versions 

The original US video release from Artisan Entertainment was heavily edited for content. Every murder sequence in the film was trimmed down for less graphic violence, including the decapitation murder of the ballet dancer which omits the image of the head hitting the floor. In all over a minute worth of footage was cut. A US DVD was also put out by Arisan of an 
unrated and fully uncut version with all the gore intact.

European DVD releases of the film are completely uncut.

The German 2013 Blu-ray edition is heavily censored, nearly three minutes shorter than the director's cut.

References

External links 

 

2001 films
2001 horror films
2001 crime thriller films
2000s mystery films
2001 psychological thriller films
Italian slasher films
2000s Italian-language films
Giallo films
Crime horror films
Mystery horror films
Police detective films
Films directed by Dario Argento
Films set in 1983
Films set in 2000
Films set in Turin
Italian serial killer films
Films scored by Goblin (band)
Films with screenplays by Dario Argento
Artisan Entertainment films
2000s English-language films